Atelais illaesa is a species of beetle in the family Cerambycidae, and the only species in the genus Atelais. It was described by Pascoe in 1867.

References

Apomecynini
Beetles described in 1867
Monotypic Cerambycidae genera